Bennettiodendron is a genus of shrubs or small trees, in the family Salicaceae.

 
Salicaceae genera
Taxonomy articles created by Polbot